The College of Charleston (CofC or Charleston) is a public university in Charleston, South Carolina. Founded in 1770 and chartered in 1785, it is the oldest university in South Carolina, the thirteenth oldest institution of higher learning in the United States, and the oldest municipal college in the country. The founders of the institution included three future signers of the Declaration of Independence (Thomas Heyward Jr., Arthur Middleton, and Edward Rutledge), and three future signers of the United States Constitution (Charles Pinckney, Charles Cotesworth Pinckney, and John Rutledge).

History 

The College of Charleston was founded in 1770, making it the thirteenth oldest institution of higher education and oldest municipal college in the United States. The college's original structure, located at the site of what is now Randolph Hall, was designed similar to a barracks. In March 1785, the South Carolina General Assembly issued a charter to the college, which officially opened in 1790 and hosted its first commencement in 1794. The first president of the college was Robert Smith, who served in the position from 1790 to 1797. A second charter was issued by the general assembly in 1791 stipulating that the college would not discriminate on the basis of religion. During the Antebellum era, further development efforts in the college resulted in the construction of Randolph Hall and the President's House, both of which were built using slave labor. In 1837, the Charleston municipal government assumed control over the college. During the mid-20th century, several African Americans attempted to apply to the racially segregated college as part of the Double V campaign against racism in the United States, but they were all rejected. Though the college became a private institution to avoid being racially integrated during the civil rights movement, Black students were eventually admitted starting in 1967 as a result of external pressure.

Academics 

The College of Charleston consists of seven academic schools, as well as the Honors College and the Graduate School.

 The School of the Arts
 The School of Business
 The School of Education
 The School of Health Sciences 
 The School of Humanities and Social Sciences
 The School of Languages, Cultures, and World Affairs
 The School of Sciences, Mathematics, and Engineering
 The Honors College
 The Graduate School

Campus 
The College of Charleston's main campus in downtown Charleston includes 156 buildings, a mix of modern and historic buildings constructed from 1770 to 2009. The average building is more than 100 years old. Twenty buildings are under historic, protective easements. The College of Charleston downtown campus is listed on the National Register of Historic Places.

Outside of downtown Charleston, the campus includes the Grice Marine Lab on James Island, the J. Stewart Walker Sailing Center and the Patriots Point Athletic Complex in Mount Pleasant and the  Stono Preserve.

In 2017, Travel + Leisure magazine named it "America's Most Beautiful College Campus."

The Mace Brown Museum of Natural History is a public natural history museum located on the campus. The museum has more than 30,000 vertebrate and invertebrate fossils. The collection's focus is on the paleontology of North American mammals, and specifically the South Carolina Lowcountry.

Bully Pulpit Series 
The Bully Pulpit Series is hosted jointly by the College of Charleston's Departments of Political Science and Communication. The series welcomes presidential candidates from the two major political parties to the campus. Candidates speak with students and Charleston community members on such topics as the frequency of press conferences, the candidate's relationship with journalists and the power of the president to persuade. Major candidates that appeared during the 2008 Presidential primaries included Senator John McCain, Congressman Ron Paul, President Barack Obama and Senator John Edwards. During that season, the series was sponsored by the Allstate Insurance Company and attendance on the Bully Pulpit events drew over 6,000 attendees. During the 2016 Presidential primaries, the major candidates who participated in the series included Senator Lindsey Graham and former Maryland governor Martin O'Malley. The series hosted a slew of candidates during the 2020 Democratic Party presidential primaries. The candidates who appeared were: Mayor Pete Buttigieg, Representative Beto O'Rourke, Secretary Julian Castro, Senator Amy Klobuchar, Senator Bernie Sanders, former vice president and eventual president Joe Biden, and Representative Tulsi Gabbard.

Athletics 

The institution's 19 varsity sports teams participate in the NCAA Division I Colonial Athletic Association and are known as the Cougars. The Cougars compete at a variety of athletics facilities in the Charleston area, including the TD Arena (formerly the Carolina First Arena), the J. Stewart Walker Sailing Complex, Johnson Center Squash Courts, Patriots Point Athletic Complex and the Links at Stono Ferry. College of Charleston athletics are supported by the College of Charleston Athletic Club, which was established in 1974. During the 1970–71 school year, College of Charleston students voted to change the nickname from the Maroons to the Cougars, in honor of a cougar that had recently arrived at the Charles Towne Landing zoo. Clyde the Cougar is the current mascot.  Oliver Marmol, the new manager of the St. Louis Cardinals is a former College of Charleston baseball player.

Greek life 
Greek life has been active on campus for 120 years. In 2017, four fraternities were shut down by the college for alcohol, drugs and a sexual assault.

Notable alumni

Buildings

Listed on the Register of Historic Places 

 Randolph Hall, the college's main academic building
 William Blacklock House

Historic buildings

Other buildings

References

External links
 Official website

 
Presidents of the College of Charleston
1770 establishments in South Carolina
1785 establishments in South Carolina
Educational institutions established in 1770
Educational institutions established in 1788
National Historic Landmarks in South Carolina
Historic American Buildings Survey in South Carolina
Colonial South Carolina
Education in Charleston, South Carolina
English-American culture in South Carolina
Universities and colleges accredited by the Southern Association of Colleges and Schools
National Register of Historic Places in Charleston, South Carolina
University and college buildings on the National Register of Historic Places in South Carolina
Education in Charleston County, South Carolina
Public universities and colleges in South Carolina